Sándor Munkácsy (born 24 July 1969) is a Hungarian athlete. He competed in the men's decathlon at the 1992 Summer Olympics.

References

External links
 

1969 births
Living people
Athletes (track and field) at the 1992 Summer Olympics
Hungarian decathletes
Olympic athletes of Hungary
People from Gödöllő
Sportspeople from Pest County